Fallo! is a 2003 Italian film co-written and directed by Tinto Brass. The film is known in English as Do It! (English translation of Fallo!) and Private. The title is pun on the term "Fallo!" meaning in Italian both "Do It" and "Phallus" and the movie itself consists of a series of 6 independent vignettes.

Vignettes
ALIBI: Cinzia (Sara Cosmi) celebrates her seventh year of marriage with her husband in Casablanca. The vignette starts with the husband making Cinzia retell her gynecologist's visit with a sexy twist. The husband then arranges for her to have sex with Ali, a hotel worker. He assures a reluctant Cinzia that it will all occur naturally, leading to both the husband and Ali having sex with Cinzia.
 MONTAGGIO ALTERNATO: Stefania (Silvia Rossi) is the wife of distinguished TV news anchor Luigi (Andrea Nobili) who becomes enraged when she finds out her husband is having an affair with Erika (Federica Tommasi). She takes in a new lover in television director Bruno (Max Parodi). Includes a scene with brief finger penetration on Federica Tommasi and oral sex on Andrea Nobili.
 2 CUORI & 1 CAPANNA: The sweet Katarina Alto Adige (Raffaella Ponzo) is paid generously to meet with the perverse Frau Bertha (Virginia Barrett) a German dominatrix and her male slave in a small Tyrolean guesthouse. The scheme was concocted by her boyfriend, Neapolitan chef Cyrus (Stefano Gandolfo) so that they can open his own restaurant.
 BOTTE D’ALLEGRIA: Raffaella (Angela Ferlaino) regales her husband with stories of her affairs, some of which are very strange. Her husband enjoys this, and encourages her to keep cheating on him.
 HONNI SOIT QUI MAL Y PENSE: In the beautiful village of Cap d'Agde, Anna (Maruska Albertazzi), has leisurely fun with Mrs. Helen (Grazia Morelli) and her husband, Scottish satirist Mr. Noel (Antonio Salines).
 DIMME PORCA CHE ME PIAZE: Venetian Rosy (Federica Palmer) is on her honeymoon with her husband in London, and agrees to a dare that she must have sex in public.

Principal cast

References

External links 

2003 films
Adultery in films
Films directed by Tinto Brass
Italian comedy-drama films
2000s Italian-language films
Italian erotic drama films
2000s erotic drama films
2003 drama films
BDSM in films